Sarah Chen or Chen Shu-hua (born 14 May 1958) is a Taiwanese singer who became famous during the late-1980s and early-1990s. Her most famous hit songs, many resulting from her collaborations with songwriter Jonathan Lee, include "Awakening Dream"  and "Is it Right to Love You?" . Her 1989 album Talk to You, Listen to You  became the first album to reach a million sales in Taiwan.

After she retired from Taiwan's entertainment circle in 1998, many rumors have surfaced concerning her re-entry but none have been confirmed to be true.

In 2007, in the inaugural Singapore Mediacorp 8 Chinese Drama 25 Years, the original theme song "Samsui Women"  sung by her, was voted the Top 5 Theme Songs for the past 25 years. Samsui Women  was a popular Chinese serial produced in 1986 by Singapore Broadcasting Corporation.

From 2014 to 2019, her songs have been consistently voted by listeners into "The Top 1000 Mandarin Hits of All Times" by Singapore Press Holdings Mandarin Radio UFM100.3.

In 2018, she was voted as one of the "Top 10 Mandarin Hits Female Artists of All Times " by listeners from 1970 to 2000 hosted by Singapore Press Holdings Mandarin Radio Station 96.3HaoFM.

In 2019, out of over 1800 songs nominated by listeners in Singapore, 17 of her songs were voted into top 400 of 4 categories – "Classic Duets ", "Taiwan Ballad/MinYao ", "Best of 80s 80" and "Top 90s 90". Her duet with Jackie Chan "Understanding My Heart " took the 2nd place in "Classic Duets ", and her "Following the Sunset " secured 3rd position in "Taiwan Ballad/Minyao " category. Her most outstanding hit "Awakening Dream"  was ranked number 4 in "Best of 80s 80", and "Is it Right to Love You?"  was also voted as number 4 in "Top 90s 90" category. Overall, she is the only female artist that won the hearts of many listeners with songs spanned across four different categories from 1970s to 1990s, and ranked top 4 in these categories.

Discography
 (1967)
 (1973)
 (1976)
 (1977)
 (1977)
 (1978)
 (1979)
 (1979)
 (1980)
 (1980)
 (1981)
 (1982)
 Love is Her Name (1982)
 (1983)
 (1983)
The Right to Sing (1983)
 (1984)
 (1984)
 (1985)
 Samsui Women  (1986)
 (1987)
The Miracle of Love (1987)
 Heart of a Woman (1988)
 Will You Still Love Me Tomorrow (1988)
Hold Me Now (1989)
 Talk to You, Listen to You (1989)
 A Lifetime of Waiting (1990)
 Be Wise, Be Easy (1991)
 Sarah Chen's Taiwanese Album (1992)
 The Dearest of Sarah (1994)
 Forever (1995)
 Forever, Sarah (1995)
 Paradise Lost (1998)

References

External links
 <陳淑樺,祝福> 為她加油打氣 Well Wishes for Sarah Chen
 Dance of Sunlight 流光飞舞 | Sarah Chen fan site 陈淑桦中文网站 
 陳淑樺國際歌迷會 新浪微博 

1958 births
Living people
Musicians from Taipei
Taiwanese Buddhists
Taiwanese Mandopop singers
Taiwanese Hokkien pop singers
20th-century Taiwanese women singers